The Orchard School is a co-educational, independent school in Indianapolis, Indiana.  It was founded in 1922 and utilizes a progressive method of educating pre-kindergarten to eighth grade students.

The school, also known as Orchard Country Day School for several decades, is located on a 50-acre campus near the Meridian Hills neighborhood on the North Side of Indianapolis. Enrollment for 2015-2016 was 604 students.

History
A wing of the school building opened in September 1969.

By 1986, the school began hosting the Indiana Japanese Language School.

Heads of School
 Hillis L. Howie
 Gordon Thompson
 Daniel Vorenberg
 Charles Clark
 Joseph P. Marshall
 Thomas Rosenbluth
 Sherri Helvie

References

 "Private School Review" profile

External links
 Official website

Schools in Indianapolis
Educational institutions established in 1922
Private K–8 schools in the United States
Private middle schools in Indiana
1922 establishments in Indiana